Elizabeth "Betsy" McCagg (born April 29, 1967 in Kirkland, Washington), known under her married name as Betsy Hills, is an American rower. She finished 4th in the women's eight at the 1996 Summer Olympics. She rowed with her twin sister Mary.  She graduated from Harvard University. The rower Liz Hills is her sister-in-law.

References

External links 
 
 

1967 births
Living people
Rowers at the 1992 Summer Olympics
Rowers at the 1996 Summer Olympics
Rowers at the 2000 Summer Olympics
Olympic rowers of the United States
Sportspeople from Kirkland, Washington
World Rowing Championships medalists for the United States
American female rowers
Harvard Crimson women's rowers
Pan American Games medalists in rowing
Pan American Games gold medalists for the United States
Rowers at the 1995 Pan American Games
21st-century American women